Thyrone Tommy is a Canadian film director and screenwriter. His work includes the short film Mariner (2016) and the feature film Learn to Swim (2021), both of which premiered at the Toronto International Film Festival.

Career 
Tommy first attracted acclaim for his short film Mariner, which was named to the Toronto International Film Festival's annual year-end Canada's Top Ten list of the year's best Canadian short films in 2016, and was the winner of the Lindalee Tracey Award in 2017.

Tommy's debut feature film, Learn to Swim, premiered at the 2021 Toronto International Film Festival. His short film, Draft Day, was also screened at TIFF as part of NBA Films for Fans, a special event program of five Canadian short films about basketball. The film received positive reviews from critics, was a nominee for the DGC Discovery Award at the 2021 Directors Guild of Canada awards, and was named to TIFF's annual year-end Canada's Top Ten list for 2021.

He received a Canadian Screen Award nomination for Best Direction in a Web Program or Series at the 11th Canadian Screen Awards in 2023 for "The One Who Dies First", an episode of the comedy web series Revenge of the Black Best Friend.

He is an alumnus of the Canadian Film Centre's film program, graduating in 2017.

References

External links

Film directors from Toronto
Black Canadian filmmakers
Canadian Film Centre alumni
Living people
Year of birth missing (living people)